Kamada Ltd. is a biopharmaceutical company specializing in the development, manufacture and marketing of proteins as  pharmaceuticals. The company's headquarters and laboratories are located in the park of Kiryat Weizmann Institute of Science in Rehovot. The production facility is located in Kibbutz Beit Kama.

The company produces about 10 injectable and marketed drugs in more than 15 countries.

History 
Kamada was founded in 1990 by David Tzur, Ralph Hahn and Kamapharam Ltd., which was wholly owned by Kibbutz Beit Kama, until then Kamapharam was producing albumin, and its production facilities were acquired in full by Kamada In 1999, (35%) to a company owned by Hahn and another investor for $2.5 million.   Hahn and Tzur headed the company by the beginning of 2013. The company completed its first public offering in 2005 on the Tel Aviv Stock Exchange.

Today, the company specializes in the development, manufacture and marketing of proteins, especially for orphan diseases. The company produces about 10 injectable and marketed drugs in more than 15 countries around the world.

Kamada is a member of the Biomed index on the Tel Aviv Stock Exchange, and as of December 2012, its shares were included in the Tel Aviv 100 index.

In 2012, the company was ranked 456 among the 500 fastest growing companies in Europe  (and 15th in Israel) according to the Deloitte Index, based on their  income in  2007–2011.

In May 2014, the company announced that it had not met the target set for the trial for a hereditary emphysema in inhalation. Following the failure of the experiment, the company's market value fell within a year from $500 million to $150 million.

Products

Alpha-1 anti-trypsin for infusion (AAT IV) 
Kamada's flagship product is Glassia, approved by the FDA to treat alpha 1-antitrypsin deficiency. The active ingredient in the drug is the protein alpha-1 antitrypsin, for patients with a genetic deficiency in that protein.  The firm has a strategic agreement with Baxter for the marketing, distribution and licensing of the drug in the United States.

Production of immunoglobulins 
The company has developed a technological platform for the production of specific immunoglobulins (IgG's). It produces a specific antibody against the rabies virus, and a product for the treatment of HDN - disease of the newborn hemolytic (Hemolytic Disease of the Newborn) - a disease caused from Rh negative in the fetus.

The company cooperates with the Israeli Ministry of Health, in the framework of which it established a GMP standard for the production of serum against snake venom. The product is manufactured from the serum of hyper-immune horses .

The company has a strategic agreement with Kedrion Pharmaceuticals for the development and marketing of the KamRab  rabies immunoglobulin  in the United States.

See also
Economy of Israel
Research and development in Israel

References

External links 
 Kamada Ltd. - the company's website
 Kamada Ltd. - on the Tel Aviv Stock Exchange

Pharmaceutical companies of Israel
Science and technology in Israel
Israeli brands
Rehovot
Companies listed on the Tel Aviv Stock Exchange
Pharmaceutical companies established in 1990
Life sciences industry
Multinational companies headquartered in Israel
Companies listed on the Nasdaq